Florence Bates ( Rabe; April 15, 1888 - January 31, 1954), was an American film and stage character actress who often played grande dame characters in supporting roles.

Life and career 
Bates was the second child born to Jewish immigrant parents, in San Antonio, Texas, where her father was the owner of an antique store. She graduated from the University of Texas at Austin with a degree in mathematics, after which she taught school.

In 1909, she met and married her first husband, Joseph Ramer, and gave up her career to raise their daughter. When the marriage ended in divorce, she began to study law and, in 1914 at the age of 26, passed the bar examination. She was one of the first female lawyers in her home state and practiced law for four years in San Antonio.

After the death of her parents, Bates left the legal profession to help her sister operate their father's antique business. She became a bilingual (English—Spanish) radio commentator whose program was designed to foster good relations between the United States and Mexico. In 1929, following the stock market crash and the death of her sister, Florence closed the antique shop and married a wealthy businessman, William F. Jacoby. When he lost his fortune, the couple moved to Los Angeles and opened a bakery, which proved a successful venture. They sold it in the 1940s.

In the mid-1930s, Bates auditioned for and won the role of Miss Bates in a Pasadena Playhouse adaptation of Jane Austen's Emma. When she decided to continue working with the theater group, she changed her professional name to that of the first character she played on stage. In 1939, she was introduced to Alfred Hitchcock, who cast her in her first major screen role, Mrs. Van Hopper, in Rebecca (1940).

Bates appeared in more than 60 films over the course of the next 13 years. Among her cinema credits are Kitty Foyle, Love Crazy, The Moon and Sixpence, Mr. Lucky, Heaven Can Wait, Lullaby of Broadway, Mister Big, Since You Went Away, Kismet, Saratoga Trunk, The Secret Life of Walter Mitty, Winter Meeting, I Remember Mama, Portrait of Jennie, A Letter to Three Wives, On the Town, and Les Misérables. In television, Bates had a regular role on The Hank McCune Show and made guest appearances on I Love Lucy, My Little Margie, I Married Joan  and Our Miss Brooks.

Selected filmography

 The Man in Blue (1937) - Woman (uncredited)
 Rebecca (1940) - Mrs. Van Hopper
 Calling All Husbands (1940) - Emmie Trippe
 The Son of Monte Cristo (1940) - Countess Mathilde Von Braun
 Kitty Foyle (1940) - Customer
 Hudson's Bay (1941) - Duchess (scenes deleted)
 Road Show (1941) - Mrs. Newton
 The Devil and Miss Jones (1941) - 'Store Shopper' (store detective)
 Strange Alibi (1941) - Katie
 Love Crazy (1941) - Mrs. Cooper
 The Gay Falcon (1941) - (scenes deleted)
 The Chocolate Soldier (1941) - Madame Helene
 Kathleen (1941) - Woman Customer at Shoner's Store (uncredited)
 Mexican Spitfire at Sea (1942) - Mrs. Baldwin
 The Tuttles of Tahiti (1942) - Emily
 We Were Dancing (1942) - Mrs. Elsa Vanderlip
 The Moon and Sixpence (1942) - Tiare Johnson
 My Heart Belongs to Daddy (1942) - Mrs. Saunders
 They Got Me Covered (1943) - Gypsy Woman
 Slightly Dangerous (1943) - Mrs. Amanda Roanoke-Brooke
 Mister Big (1943) - Mrs. Mary Davis
 Mr. Lucky (1943) - Mrs. Van Every
 Heaven Can Wait (1943) - Mrs. Edna Craig (uncredited)
 His Butler's Sister (1943) - Lady Sloughberry
 Since You Went Away (1944) - Hungry Woman on Train (uncredited)
 The Mask of Dimitrios (1944) - Madame Elise Chavez
 Kismet (1944) - Karsha
 Belle of the Yukon (1944) - Viola Chase
 Tahiti Nights (1944) - Queen Liliha
 Tonight and Every Night (1945) - May Tolliver
 Out of This World (1945) - Harriet Pringle
 Saratoga Trunk (1945) - Sophie Bellop
 San Antonio (1945) - Henrietta
 Whistle Stop (1946) - Molly Veech
 The Diary of a Chambermaid (1946) - Rose
 Claudia and David (1946) - Nancy Riddle
 Cluny Brown (1946) - Dowager at Ames' Party
 The Time, the Place and the Girl (1946) - Mme. Lucia Cassel
 The Man I Love (1947) - Mrs. Thorpe (uncredited)
 The Brasher Doubloon (1947) - Mrs. Elizabeth Murdock
 Love and Learn (1947) - Mrs. Bella Davis - Landlady
 The Secret Life of Walter Mitty (1947) - Mrs. Irma Griswold
 Desire Me (1947) - Mrs.Lannie (scenes deleted)
 The Judge Steps Out (1948) - Chita
 I Remember Mama (1948) - Florence Dana Moorhead
 The Inside Story (1948) - Geraldine Atherton
 Winter Meeting (1948) - Mrs. Castle
 River Lady (1948) - Ma Dunnegan
 Texas, Brooklyn & Heaven (1948) - Mandy
 My Dear Secretary (1948) - Horrible Hannah Reeve (the landlady)
 Portrait of Jennie (1948) - Mrs. Jekes (landlady)
 A Letter to Three Wives (1949) - Mrs. Manleigh
 The Girl from Jones Beach (1949) - Miss Emma Shoemaker
 On the Town (1949) - Madame Dilyovska
 Belle of Old Mexico (1950) - Nellie Chatfield
 The Second Woman (1950) - Amelia Foster
 County Fair (1950) - Nora 'Ma' Ryan
 Lullaby of Broadway (1951) - Mrs. Anna Hubbell
 Father Takes the Air (1951) - Minerva Bobbin
 The Tall Target (1951) - Mrs. Charlotte Alsop
 Havana Rose (1951) - Mrs. Fillmore
 I Love Lucy (1952) - (S1E25) “Pioneer Woman” - Mrs Pettibone
 The San Francisco Story (1952) - Sadie
 Les Misérables (1952) - Madame Bonnet
 Main Street to Broadway (1953) - Mrs. Bessmer in Fantasy Sequence
 Paris Model (1953) - Mrs. Nora Sullivan

References

Further reading

External links

 

Actresses from San Antonio
American film actresses
American television actresses
American radio personalities
Texas lawyers
Jewish American actresses
University of Texas at Austin College of Natural Sciences alumni
20th-century American actresses
Burials at Forest Lawn Memorial Park (Glendale)
20th-century American lawyers